The Jersey Syndicate Tour (also known as The Brotherhood on Tour and New Jersey: The Tour) was the fourth concert tour by American band Bon Jovi, that ran from 1988 to 1990.  The massive, highly successful world tour was put on in support of the band's fourth studio album New Jersey (1988).

Background
The tour was the band's first major world tour taking them to new continents of Australia and Europe. Bon Jovi also made history in becoming one of the first North American bands to play Russia, with two performances there at the Moscow Music Peace Festival on August 12–13, 1989.

The tour was very grueling and exhausting and led to the band's hiatus at the tour's conclusion. Bon Jovi had toured heavily since 1984 and the tour put pressures on the band's relationships with each other and their families, on their health, and their emotions. The tour was often noted for its extended musical performances of songs, which would often run twice the length of the album track as well as raw emotional vocal performances by Jon Bon Jovi.  Jon had to enlist the help of a vocal coach to help sustain his voice and lead guitarist Richie Sambora would often help out more on the high notes. The band would also perform some of their songs in acoustic format, signaling a change in musical style and maturation of the band.

The concert performances on the tour featured vivid pyrotechnics, a catwalk elevated above the crowd, and Jon entering the stage through a hole in the stage.  Prior to the band taking the stage Emerson Lake & Palmer's Karn Evil 9 First Impression Part Two was played at full volume over the PA. The concerts also required extensive security due to the band's iconic status as major rock stars of the time.

In addition, Bon Jovi shot the music videos for "Lay Your Hands on Me", "I'll Be There for You", and "Blood on Blood" during performances on the tour, and recorded footage for their video releases Access All Areas and New Jersey: The Videos on this tour.

This was the last tour by the band to feature a notable amount of material from their first two albums. After the band hit it big with the album Slippery When Wet, they began to phase their pre-stardom material out of their live sets because according to interviews it did not match the standards set by the material on their later releases. Even on this tour only "Runaway" and "Get Ready" from Bon Jovi and "Tokyo Road" from 7800° Fahrenheit were performed except for one performance of "Silent Night" at the Hammersmith Odeon in 1990. 

With the exception of "Runaway", which is still played regularly to this day, virtually nothing from those albums has been performed since the tour's conclusion (though a notable exception is on "The Circle Tour" in 2010 in which Get Ready, Shot Through the Heart, Tokyo Road, Roulette and Only Lonely were played).

Opening acts

Lita Ford 
Dan Reed Network 
Skid Row 
Roxus 
Scorpions 
Cinderella 
Billy Squier 
Sam Kinison 
Bad Company 
BulletBoys 
Winger 
Icon 
Johnny Diesel and the Injectors 
Noiseworks 
Knights Blade

Setlist
The following setlist was obtained from the concert held on March 15, 1989, at the Brendan Byrne Arena in East Rutherford, New Jersey. It does not represent all concerts for the duration of the tour. 
"Lay Your Hands on Me"
"I'd Die for You"
"Wild in the Streets"
"You Give Love a Bad Name"
"Tokyo Road"
"Born to Be My Baby"
"Let It Rock"
"I'll Be There for You"
"Blood on Blood"
"Runaway"
"Livin' on a Prayer"
"Living in Sin"
"Travelin' Band"
"Ride Cowboy Ride"
"Wanted Dead or Alive"
"Bad Medicine"
"Shout"
"Never Say Goodbye"

Tour dates

Festivals and other miscellaneous performances
This concert was a part of "Heat Beat Live"
This concert was a part of the "Moscow Music Peace Festival"
This concert was a part of the "Milton Keynes Festival"
This concert was a part of the "Christmas Rock Festival"
This concert was a part of a charity benefit for "Nordoff–Robbins music therapy"
This concert was a part of "Hollywood Rock"
This concert was a part of the "Derby Rocks Festival"

Cancellations and rescheduled shows

References

External links
Bon Jovi on stage | New Jersey tour
NEW JERSEY SYNDICATE TOUR (1989)
NEW JERSEY SYNDICATE TOUR (1990)

Bon Jovi concert tours
1988 concert tours
1989 concert tours
1990 concert tours